Kilcullane is a civil parish and townland located in County Limerick, Ireland. The civil parish is in the barony of Smallcounty. It is located in east County Limerick near the village of Bruff. The north-eastern part of the parish borders the parish of Ballinard.

Ecclesiastical parish
Like all civil parishes, this civil parish is derived from, and co-extensive with a pre-existing Church of Ireland parish of the same name in the diocese of Cashel and Emly. According to Lewis' Topography of Ireland (1837), the Medieval church located in the townland of Kilcullane was recorded as being in ruins.

In the Catholic Church, the civil parish forms part of the ecclesiastical parish of "Herbertstown and Hospital" located at the western edge of the Roman Catholic Archdiocese of Cashel and Emly. There are two church buildings in the parish: the Sacred Heart Church, Herbertstown;National Inventory of Architectural Heritage - Sacred Heart Roman Catholic Church, BALLINARD, Register number 21903224 St. John The Baptist, Hospital.

Townlands

There are five townlands in the parish:
 Ballinscoola which constitutes 265 acres and is bounded to the west by the River Camogue
 Herbertstown (O'Grady) which constitutes 163 acres and forms the western side of the village of Herbertstown.
 Herbertstown (Powell) which constitutes 163 acres and forms the southern edge of the village of Herbertstown.
 Kilcullane which constitutes 724 acres and contains Kilcullane House alongside the ruins of a church and a castle. 
 Gortnaskagh which constitutes 72 acres and contained Gortnaskagh Lodge.

References
From 

Other:

Civil parishes of County Limerick